Rastrick is a village and an unparished area in the metropolitan borough of Calderdale, West Yorkshire, England.   Rastrick Ward contains 30 listed buildings that are recorded in the National Heritage List for England.  Of these, two are listed at Grade II*, the middle of the three grades, and the others are at Grade II, the lowest grade.  The listed buildings include houses and associated structures including lodges, cottages, a farmhouse, a church and a cross base in the churchyard, a lock on the Calder and Hebble Navigation, a guide post and two milestones, a carved stone set into a wall, a library, and a war memorial.


Key

Buildings

References

Citations

Sources

Lists of listed buildings in West Yorkshire